Trevor Stead (born 12 October 1969) is a Zimbabwean cricketer. He played three first-class matches for Mashonaland in 1993/94.

See also
 List of Mashonaland first-class cricketers

References

External links
 

1969 births
Living people
Zimbabwean cricketers
Mashonaland cricketers
Sportspeople from Kadoma, Zimbabwe